Giurgiu is a city in southern Romania. The seat of Giurgiu County, it lies in the historical region of Muntenia. It is situated amongst mud-flats and marshes on the left bank of the Danube facing the Bulgarian city of Ruse on the opposite bank. Three small islands face the city, and a larger one shelters its port, Smarda. The rich grain-growing land to the north is traversed by a railway to Bucharest, the first line opened in Romania, which was built in 1869 and afterwards extended to Smarda. In the past, Giurgiu exported timber, grain, salt and petroleum, and imported coal, iron, and textiles.

The Giurgiu-Ruse Friendship Bridge, in the shared Bulgarian-Romanian section of the Danube, crosses the river in the outskirts of the city.

History

The area around Giurgiu was densely populated at the time of the Dacians (1st century BC) as archeological evidence shows, and Burebista's capital was in this area (it is thought to be in Popeşti on the Argeş River). During Roman times this was the site of Theodorapolis, a city built by the Roman emperor Justinian (483-565).

The city of Giurgiu was probably established in the 14th century as a port on the Danube by the Genoese merchant adventurers, who established a bank and traded in silks and velvets.

One theory is that they called the city after the patron saint of Genoa, San Giorgio (St George), however Nicolae Iorga disputes this theory, arguing that Giurgiu is just an old Romanian form of George.

It was first mentioned in Codex Latinus Parisinus in 1395, during the reign of Mircea I of Wallachia, and was conquered by the Ottomans in 1420 as a way to control the Danube traffic. The Ottomans named the city Yergöğü, as if from yer 'earth' + gök 'sky,' but the name was probably given because of the similarity between the pronunciations of "(San) Giorgio" and "Yergöğü".

As a fortified city, Giurgiu figured often in the wars for the conquest of the lower Danube. It was the site of the October 1595 Battle of Giurgiu, and figured in the struggle of Michael the Brave (1593–1601) against the Turks and in the later Russo-Turkish War (1787-1792). It was burned in 1659. In 1771, the Ottomans built the historic Giurgiu Clocktower as a surveillance tower for Danube traffic. In 1829, its fortifications were finally razed, the only defence left being a castle on the island of Slobozia, connected to the shore by a bridge.

In 1952–1954, during the Communist regime, the USSR helped build the bridge between Giurgiu and Ruse, The Friendship Bridge, a bridge on the Danube linking Romania and Bulgaria.

Jewish history

Sephardi Jewish merchants came to Giurgiu from the Balkans in the 1820s and Ashkenazi Jews settled later, leading to communal disputes. A 70-member Zionist group was formed in 1899. A joint Jewish school opened in 1878, with 60 pupils in 1910. The Jewish population by that point was 533, or 4% of the total. By 1930, their number had fallen to 207, or 0.7%. Jews were forced to forfeit their property to the Iron Guard in 1941 and at least half of the 113 Jews living there that year left. A community existed after World War II.

Demographics

According to the 2011 census, Giurgiu has a population of 54,655.

Notable natives
  (1870–1954), painter
 Ioan A. Bassarabescu (1870–1952), writer
 Nicolae Dărăscu (1883–1959), painter
 Toma Ghițulescu (1902–1983), engineer, politician, and Olympic bobsledder
 Emil Gulian (1907–1942), poet
 Gino Iorgulescu (b. 1956), former Romanian football international
 Dumitru Iuca (1882–1940), politician
 Theodor Anton Neagu (b. 1932), palaeontologist
 Miron Nicolescu (1903–1975), mathematician, President of the Romanian Academy
 Eugenia Popescu-Județ (1925–2011), dancer
 Paraskev Stoyanov (1876–1940), Bulgarian physicist and surgeon
 Constantin Teașcă (1922–1996), football coach and writer
  (1903–1936), writer and translator
 Tudor Vianu (1898–1964), literary critic, art critic, poet, philosopher, academic, and translator
 Ion Vinea (1895–1964), poet, novel, journalist, literary theorist, and political figure
  (1869–1932), Bulgarian aviation pioneer

International relations

Twin towns – Sister cities
Giurgiu is twinned with:
  Ruse, Bulgaria
  Dunaújváros, Hungary

See also 

 FC Astra Giurgiu, the city's professional football club

References

External links

 
Populated places on the Danube
Territories of the Republic of Genoa
Port cities and towns in Romania
Cities in Romania
Capitals of Romanian counties
Populated places in Giurgiu County
Localities in Muntenia
Bulgaria–Romania border crossings